Free University may refer to any of the following universities:

 Université libre de Bruxelles, Brussels, Belgium
 Vrije Universiteit Brussel, Brussels, Belgium
 Free University of Berlin, Berlin, Germany
 Free University of Bozen-Bolzano, Bolzano, Italy
 Free University of Colombia, Bogota, Colombia
 Copenhagen Free University, Copenhagen, Denmark
 Free International University, Düsseldorf, Germany
 Free University of Ireland, Dublin, Ireland
 Melbourne Free University, Melbourne, Australia
 Midpeninsula Free University, Palo Alto, California, United States (now defunct)
 Open University, Milton Keynes, United Kingdom
 Free University of New York, New York City, New York, United States 
 Independent University of Moscow, Moscow, Russia
 Free University of San Francisco, San Francisco, United States
 Free University of Tbilisi, Tbilisi, Georgia
 Vrije Universiteit Amsterdam, Amsterdam, Netherlands